Joseph MacBride (1860 – 1 January 1938) was an Irish Sinn Féin and later Cumann na nGaedheal politician. He was a member of the Irish Volunteers. His brother Major John MacBride fought in the 1916 Easter Rising and was executed by the British authorities. Joseph was arrested after the Rising and interned in prison in England and Wales.

He was elected as a Sinn Féin MP for the Mayo West constituency at the 1918 general election. In January 1919, Sinn Féin MPs refused to recognise the Parliament of the United Kingdom and instead assembled at the Mansion House in Dublin as a revolutionary parliament called Dáil Éireann, though MacBride did not attend as he was in prison.

He was re-elected unopposed at the 1921 elections for the Mayo North and West constituency. He supported the Anglo-Irish Treaty and voted for it. He was again re-elected unopposed at the 1922 general election as a member of Pro-Treaty Sinn Féin. He joined Cumann na nGaedheal along with other pro-Treaty Sinn Féin TDs in 1923, and was elected at the 1923 general election for Mayo South. He lost his seat at the June 1927 general election and retired from politics.

His nephew Seán MacBride was subsequently Chief of Staff of the IRA and a founder of Clann na Poblachta and a government minister.

See also
Families in the Oireachtas

References

External links

1860 births
1938 deaths
Cumann na nGaedheal TDs
Early Sinn Féin TDs
Joseph
Members of the 1st Dáil
Members of the 2nd Dáil
Members of the 3rd Dáil
Members of the 4th Dáil
Members of the Parliament of the United Kingdom for County Mayo constituencies (1801–1922)
Politicians from County Mayo
UK MPs 1918–1922